James Arthur Knowlton (born 1960) is an American college athletics administrator and civil engineer who is the current director of athletics for the University of California, Berkeley. Previously, Knowlton served as the athletic director for the United States Air Force Academy and Rensselaer Polytechnic Institute.

Originally from Burlington, Massachusetts, Knowlton graduated from the United States Military Academy at West Point in 1982, where he studied engineering and played on the Army Black Knights men's ice hockey team. Knowlton then served in the United States Army, rising to commander and later assistant director at the Army Corps of Engineers. Knowlton also was a civil engineering at West Point.

Beginning in 2003 as deputy athletics director at Army, Knowlton worked as a college athletics administrator. Knowlton later was athletics director at Rensselaer Polytechnic Institute from 2008 to 2015 and the U.S. Air Force Academy from 2015 to 2018.

Early life and education
Knowlton grew up in Burlington, Massachusetts, and graduated from Austin Preparatory School in 1978. Knowlton completed a bachelor's degree in engineering from the United States Military Academy (West Point) in 1982. While attending West Point, Knowlton played at forward on West Point's Army Black Knights men's ice hockey team.

Military and academic career
After graduating from West Point, Knowlton served in the United States Army, first in the 9th Engineer Battalion stationed in Aschaffenburg, West Germany as platoon leader, executive officer, and company commander. After completing the Armor Officer Advanced Course, Knowlton returned to Germany to command the 42nd Engineer Company, Berlin Brigade.
After completing a master's degree in civil engineering at the Cornell University College of Engineering, Knowlton joined the West Point civil and mechanical engineering department faculty in 1992. In 1994, Knowlton attended the United States Army Command and General Staff College, after which he returned to active Army duty as assistant division engineer and operations officer for the 307th Engineer Battalion, 82nd Airborne Division. Knowlton was later assigned to The Pentagon, first as military aide to the Under Secretary of the Army Joe R. Reeder and later as assistant director at the Army Corps of Engineers headquarters. Beginning in 1999, Knowlton led a 750-strong battalion at Fort Carson in Colorado. He followed that assignment with a stint as joint exercise branch chief for Air Force Space Command and deploying to Iraq. In the Army, Knowlton earned the Legion of Merit, Meritorious Service Medal with four oak leaf clusters, Ranger Tab, Air Assault Badge, and Senior Parachutist Badge.

Knowlton is also a registered professional engineer in Virginia.

Athletics administration career
From 2003 to 2006, Knowlton was deputy athletic director for the Army Black Knights athletic programs of his alma mater United States Military Academy. Knowlton stepped down from that position in 2006 to direct the Center for Enhanced Performance on campus.

In 2008, Knowlton became athletic director at Rensselaer Polytechnic Institute (RPI), an NCAA Division III school. Returning to the Division I level, Knowlton became the 11th athletic director at the United States Air Force Academy on March 22, 2015.

Knowlton was named athletic director at the University of California, Berkeley on April 9, 2018.

On August 2, 2021 Knowlton announced that he had agreed to an eight year extension with Cal, keeping him in Berkeley through 2029. Knowlton received the extension following his decision to give head football coach Justin Wilcox an extension through the 2023 season, his decision to hire Mark Fox as head men's basketball coach, and his decision to hire Charmin Smith as head women's basketball coach.

In May 2022, Knowlton was cited as having been dismissive of complaints against Cal head women's swim coach Teri McKeever, who was accused by current and former Cal swimmers of bullying, verbal, and emotional abuse. In June 2022, Knowlton received more pushback for telling current Cal swimmers and their families that the investigation into McKeever could take six months. Knowlton responded to this pushback saying he shares the concerns of the swimmers and their families.

McKeever was fired by Cal after an investigation that concluded in 2023.

“I’m writing to inform you that today we have parted ways with long-time women’s swimming coach, Teri McKeever,” Cal athletic director Jim Knowlton wrote to Cal swimmers. “After carefully reviewing an extensive investigative report that was recently completed by an independent law firm, I strongly believe this is in the best interests of our student athletes, our swimming program, and Cal Athletics as a whole.

“The report details numerous violations of university policies that prohibit race, national origin, and disability discrimination. The report also details verbally abusive conduct that is antithetical to our most important values. I was disturbed by what I learned in the course of reading through the report’s 482 pages that substantiate far too many allegations of unacceptable behavior. I want to apologize, on behalf of Cal Athletics, to every student-athlete who was subject to this conduct in the past, and I want to thank everyone who had the courage to come forward and share their story with the investigators.” 

According to The East Bay Times/Southern California News Group, "But for dozens of current and former Cal swimmers, McKeever’s firing and the report did not go far enough. The weeks following the firing and release of the report have seen prominent financial donors to the university and its athletic program joining current and former Golden Bears swimmers and their parents in calling for the immediate dismissal of Knowlton and Simon-O’Neill, who critics allege ignored or failed to effectively address repeated credible allegations of bullying and harassment against McKeever."

The East Bay Times/Southern California News Group also reported that UC Berkeley is taking additional steps beyond the firing of McKeever. UC Berkeley declined to comment on whether or not investigating Jim Knowlton and Jennifer Simon-O'Neill (Chief of Staff & Senior Woman Administrator) were part of those additional steps, but UC Berkeley assistant vice chancellor Dan Mogulof did confirm that as of this time, neither of the two have been placed on leave.

References

External links

 
 California Golden Bears bio
 Air Force Falcons bio

1960 births
Living people
Air Force Falcons athletic directors
Army Black Knights men's ice hockey players
California Golden Bears athletic directors
People from Burlington, Massachusetts
RPI Engineers athletic directors
Cornell University College of Engineering alumni
United States Military Academy faculty
Engineers from Virginia
United States Army colonels
American men's ice hockey forwards
Military personnel from Massachusetts